Jon Fortt (born December 12, 1976) is an American journalist and the co-anchor of CNBC's Closing Bell Overtime broadcast. He previously co-anchored TechCheck. He is the creator and host of Fortt Knox, a technology, leadership and innovation brand that has existed as a podcast  and streaming program since 2016 and now has its primary home on Linkedin.

On Fortt Knox he has interviewed entrepreneurs, CEOs and celebrities including Michael Dell, Adena Friedman, Reid Hoffman, Daymond John, Satya Nadella, Katrina Lake, Michael Phelps, Q-Tip and Andy Jassy. In September 2021, he crafted a weekly segment on CNBC's Power Lunch program called "Working Lunch," which excerpts Fortt Knox interviews to introduce viewers to the personalities and strategies of founders and CEOs. In August 2020, he crafted a weekly segment on CNBC's Squawk Box program called "On the Other Hand," in which he argues two sides of one business or technology issue. Earlier in 2020, he created The Black Experience in America: The Course, at forttmedia.com.

Early life and education 
Fortt was born on Long Island, New York. His family later moved to Washington, D.C. He attended Montgomery Blair High School, where as president of the Student Government Association in the 1993–94 school year he was among the students who organized protests to push the county to build a new school in its current location, then known as the Kay tract. In his senior year he won the Knight-Ridder Minority Journalism Scholarship. He attended DePauw University, where he was part of the Media Fellows honors program. There he worked at The DePauw student newspaper and became editor. He graduated with a Bachelor of Arts in English Writing. On May 22, 2022, he delivered the commencement address at DePauw, a message called "Love, Truth and Impact." He joined DePauw's board of trustees in October 2022.

Career 
Fortt began his post-college career at the Lexington Herald-Leader in Lexington, Kentucky, where he was assigned the technology beat in 1999 after another reporter suddenly quit. Later that year he moved to California to join the San Jose Mercury News, Silicon Valley's hometown newspaper. In 2006 he went to Business 2.0 magazine as a senior editor in charge of the "What Works" section. In 2007, he joined Fortune Magazine as a senior writer covering large companies including Apple, Hewlett-Packard and Microsoft. Fortt began working for CNBC in 2010 as a Silicon Valley-based technology correspondent. CNBC brought him to its New York-area headquarters in 2013. He joined the board of the National Summer Learning Association, a non-profit, in 2021.

References 

1976 births
Living people
African-American journalists
American television news anchors
CNBC people
21st-century American journalists
DePauw University alumni
21st-century African-American people
20th-century African-American people